Visa requirements for Moldovan citizens are administrative entry restrictions imposed on citizens of Moldova by the authorities of other states. As of 22 December 2022, Moldovan citizens had visa-free or visa on arrival access to 121 countries and territories, ranking the Moldovan passport 48th in terms of travel freedom according to the Henley Passport Index.

On 28 April 2014 Moldovan citizens were granted visa-free entry to 26 Schengen Area countries as well as Bulgaria, Croatia, Cyprus and Romania, countries that are applying the Schengen policy and also Monaco, San Marino, Andorra and Vatican City, countries that have no immigration control. Visa waiver applies only to holders of biometric passports.

Visa requirements map

Visa requirements

Territories and disputed areas
Visa requirements for Moldovan citizens for visits to various territories, disputed areas, partially recognized countries and restricted zones:

Visas for Cambodia, Myanmar, Rwanda, São Tomé and Príncipe, Senegal, Sri Lanka and Turkey are obtainable online.

Non-visa restrictions
Moldovan passports are recognized by all countries of the world. However, in some rare cases, Moldovan citizens may be refused entry.

Fingerprinting
Several countries including Argentina, Cambodia, Japan, Malaysia, Saudi Arabia, South Korea and the United States demand all passengers to be fingerprinted on arrival.

See also

 Visa policy of Moldova
 Moldovan passport

References and Notes
References

Notes

Moldova
Foreign relations of Moldova